Robert Ernest Andrews (born August 4, 1957) is an American politician who served as a U.S. representative for  from 1990 to 2014. The district included most of Camden County and parts of Burlington County and Gloucester County. He is a member of the Democratic Party.

Early life, education, and early career 
Andrews was born in Camden, New Jersey, the son of Josephine (née Amies) and Ernest Andrews; he is predominantly of Scottish and Scotch-Irish descent and counts American portrait painter Charles Willson Peale and Johannes Roosevelt among his ancestors. He grew up in Bellmawr and attended Triton Regional High School in Runnemede. Andrews was the first in his family to attend college, graduating from Bucknell University in 1979 with a BA in political science, summa cum laude. He later attended Cornell University Law School, earning his JD degree with honors in 1982. Before his election to Congress, Andrews was involved in legal education as a member of Cornell Law Review‍‍ '‍s board of editors. 

He worked as an attorney and an adjunct professor at the Rutgers School of Law–Camden. Starting in 1983, Andrews operated a private legal practice. In 1986, he was elected as a member of the Camden County Board of Chosen Freeholders, where he served for four years, including two years as freeholder director (1988–1990).

U.S. House of Representatives
First elected to Congress in 1990, Andrews served for 24 years as the U.S. representative for New Jersey's 1st congressional district, which includes most of Camden County and parts of Burlington County and Gloucester County. In the U.S. House of Representatives, he served on the Committee on Armed Services, Committee on the Budget, and Committee on Education and Labor, where he served as chairman of the Subcommittee on Health, Employment, Labor, and Pensions.

Elections
In 1990, after a 15-year incumbent Democratic U.S. Congressman James Florio resigned from the U.S. House of Representatives to take office as Governor of New Jersey, Andrews won the 1990 special election and simultaneous general election against Gloucester County Freeholder Daniel J. Mangini. He subsequently won re-election every two years until his retirement. Andrews had the 10th longest tenure among U.S. Representatives in New Jersey history, and the fifth longest among Democrats state. In November 2004, he received more votes than anyone ever elected to the U.S. House of Representatives from New Jersey, a record which he broke once again in 2012.

Committee assignments
 Committee on Armed Services
 Subcommittee on Strategic Forces
 Subcommittee on Emerging Threats and Capabilities
 Committee on Education and the Workforce
 Subcommittee on Higher Education and Workforce Training
 Subcommittee on Health, Employment, Labor, and Pensions (Ranking Member)
 Co-Chairman of the Steering and Policy Committee

Caucus memberships
 Congressional Arts Caucus
 Congressional Fire Services Caucus 
 Hunger Caucus

Tenure
The New York Times characterized Congressman Andrews as "fiscally conservative but socially moderate." He has a lifetime rating of 17.24 from the American Conservative Union and a 2007 rating of 100 from Americans for Democratic Action. He has a liberal rating of 76.2 and a conservative rating of 23.8 from the National Journal.

According to President Barack Obama, he was an original author of the Affordable Care Act that was designed to cut the costs for American taxpayers on healthcare.

Alleged misuse of campaign funds 

On December 2, 2008, the Citizens for Responsibility and Ethics in Washington (CREW) filed a complaint against Andrews and four other politicians to the Federal Election Commission (FEC) for allegedly violating the Federal Election Campaign Act (FECA). In the complaint, CREW stated that Andrews's campaign committee spent $952.04 of campaign funds on clothing, which FECA classified as personal spending. A spokesman for Andrews responded that the clothing was intended to replace lost luggage from a flight, and that Andrews deposited $952.04 into his campaign account after the airline reimbursed him. The FEC dismissed the complaint on July 16, 2009, but affirmed in the dismissal that the purchases violated campaign finance laws.

The Star-Ledger reported on November 20, 2011 that Andrews financed a family vacation to Edinburgh, Scotland and other European destinations with over $9,000 of campaign funds. The report claimed that Andrews "mixed personal and political expenses in an unorthodox way" on multiple occasions. These expenses included a $10,000 house party celebrating both his career anniversary and his daughter's graduation, a $12,500 donation to the Walnut Street Theatre – where his daughter performed, and trips to California that overlapped with his daughter's auditions. Andrews and his chief of staff replied that the vacation involved attending an adviser's wedding, the party was primarily for "political associates", the theatre donation was in support of its outreach program, and his daughter assisted him with fundraising during their trips.

CREW filed another compliant with the FEC on November 30, 2011 based on The Star-Ledgers article. Andrews described the complaint as "baseless" and stated, "The campaign has fully complied with all laws with respect to the proper expenditure and disclosure of campaign funds. All personal aspects of any expenditures or activities have always been paid in full from our family’s personal funds." The Associated Press elaborated on March 28, 2012 that Andrews's 18 trips to California from 2007 to 2012 resulted in over $97,000 of campaign expenses and $260,000 of donations, short of the 3:1 ratio of donations to expenses that is expected from political fundraising trips.

The United States House Committee on Ethics started researching the complaint on July 17, 2012, and decided on August 31 that it would proceed with an investigation. On March 19, 2013, the Committee declared that a special panel would examine whether Andrews's travel expenses from the Edinburgh and California trips complied with campaign finance laws. Andrews resigned from Congress on February 4, 2014. He said that the campaign finance probe had "no role at all" in his resignation, and that he was departing for a position at the Dilworth Paxson law firm. The FEC dismissed the complaint on June 3, 2014 with "prosecutorial discretion", noting that Andrews reimbursed his campaign for the Edinburgh trip before he received the complaint, and that any violations in the California trips were "relatively small".

In February 2014, Andrews resigned from his position in the middle of his term, while being investigated by the United States House Committee on Ethics for alleged violations related to his use of campaign funds for personal expenses. Andrews stated it was to take a job with a law firm in Philadelphia. The complaint was dismissed in June 2014.

Other political activities
In 1997, Andrews ran for Governor of New Jersey. In the Democratic primary, he was defeated 40%–37%, a margin of 9,993 votes, by State Senator Jim McGreevey.
Andrews was a candidate for the Democratic nomination in the 2008 U.S. Senate election. Andrews lost to incumbent Lautenberg, but subsequently won re-election to his House seat, with Andrews "received more votes in November 2008 than anyone ever elected to the U.S. House in New Jersey, breaking his own record."

Personal life
Andrews is married and has two daughters.

Electoral history
{| class="wikitable" style="margin:0.5em ; font-size:95%"
|+ : Results 1990–2012
!|Year
!
!|Democrat
!|Votes
!|Pct
!
!|Republican
!|Votes
!|Pct
!
!|3rd Party
!|Party
!|Votes
!|Pct
!
!|3rd Party
!|Party
!|Votes
!|Pct
!
!|3rd Party
!|Party
!|Votes
!|Pct
!
!|3rd Party
!|Party
!|Votes
!|Pct
!
|-
| 1990(special)
|
|  |
|  align="right" |71,373
|  align="right" |55%
|
|  |Daniel J. Mangini
|  align="right" |58,087
|  |45%
|
|
|
|
|
|
|
|
|
|
|
|
|
|
|
|
|
|
|
|
|
|-
| 1990
|
|  |
|  align="right" |72,415
|  align="right" |54%
|
|  |Daniel J. Mangini
|  align="right" |57,299
|  |43%
|
|  |Jerry Zeldin
|  |Libertarian
|  align="right" |1,592
|  align="right" |1%
|
|  |Walter E. Konstanty
|  |Pride and Honesty
|  align="right" |1,422
|  align="right" |1%
|
|  |William H. Harris
|  |Populist
|  align="right" |1,066
|  align="right" |1%
|
|
|
|
|
|
|-
| 1992
|
|  |Rob Andrews
|  align="right" |153,525
|  align="right" |67%
|
|  |Lee A. Solomon
|  align="right" |65,123
|  |29%
|
|  |James E. Smith
|  |Pro-Life Pro-Family Veteran
|  align="right" |3,761
|  align="right" |2%
|
|  |Jerry Zeldin
|  |Libertarian
|  align="right" |2,641
|  align="right" |1%
|
|  |Kenneth L. Lowndes
|  |Pro-Life Independent Conservative
|  align="right" |2,163
|  align="right" |1%
|
|  |Nicholas Pastuch
|  |America First Populist
|  align="right" |859
|  align="right" |<1%
|
|-
| 1994
|
|  |Rob Andrews
|  align="right" |108,155
|  align="right" |72%
|
|  |James N. Hogan
|  align="right" |41,505
|  |28%
|
|
|
|
|
|
|
|
|
|
|
|
|
|
|
|
|
|
|
|
|
|-
| 1996
|
|  |Rob Andrews
|  align="right" |160,413
|  align="right" |76%
|
|  |Mel Suplee
|  align="right" |44,287
|  |21%
|
|  |Michael Edmondson
|  |Independent
|  align="right" |2,668
|  align="right" |1%
|
|  | Bily
|  |Independent
|  align="right" |1,873
|  align="right" |1%
|
|  | Wahner
|  |Independent
|  align="right" |1,493
|  align="right" |1%
|
|
|
|
|
|
|-
| 1998
|
|  |Rob Andrews
|  align="right" |90,279
|  align="right" |73%
|
|  |
|  align="right" |27,855
|  |23%
|
|  | 
|  |Independent
|  align="right" |1,684
|  align="right" |1%
|
|  | Stockman
|  |Independent
|  align="right" |1,324
|  align="right" |1%
|
|  |Edward Forchion
|  |Independent
|  align="right" |1,257
|  align="right" |1%
|
|  | Barber
|  |Independent
|  align="right" |943
|  align="right" |1%
|
|-
| 2000
|
|  |Rob Andrews
|  align="right" |167,327
|  align="right" |76%
|
|  |
|  align="right" |46,455
|  |21%
|
|  | Parrish
|  |Independent
|  align="right" |3,090
|  align="right" |1%
|
|  |Edward Forchion
|  |Independent
|  align="right" |1,959
|  align="right" |1%
|
|  | Patalivo
|  |Independent
|  align="right" |781
|  align="right" |<1%
|
|
|
|
|
|
|-
| 2002
|
|  |Rob Andrews
|  align="right" |121,846
|  align="right" |93%
|
|  |(no candidate)
|  align="right" |
|  |
|
|  |Timothy Haas
|  |Libertarian
|  align="right" |9,543
|  align="right" |7%
|
|
|
|
|
|
|
|
|
|
|
|
|
|
|
|
|-
| 2004
|
|  |Rob Andrews
|  align="right" |201,163
|  align="right" |75%
|
|  |
|  align="right" |66,109
|  |25%
|
|  |Arturo F. Croce
|  |E Pluribus Unum
|  align="right" |931
|  align="right" |<1%
|
|
|
|
|
|
|
|
|
|
|
|
|
|
|
|
|-
| 2006
|
|  |Rob Andrews
|  align="right" |140,110
|  align="right" |100%
|
|  |(no candidate)
|  align="right" |
|  |
|
|
|
|
|
|
|
|
|
|
|
|
|
|
|
|
|
|
|
|
|
|-
| 2008
|
|  |Rob Andrews
|  align="right" |191,796
|  align="right" |72%
|
|  |Dale M. Glading
|  align="right" |70,466
|  |26%
|
|  |Matthew Thieke
|  |Green
|  align="right" |1,778
|  align="right" |<1%
|
|  |Margaret Chapman
|  | Basics
|  align="right" |1,188
|  align="right" |<1%
|
|  |Everitt M. 
|  |Think Independently
|  align="right" |954
|  align="right" |<1%
|
|  |Alvin Lindsay
|  |Lindsay for Congress
|  align="right" |483
|  align="right" |<1%
|
|-
| 2010
|
|  |Rob Andrews
|  align="right" |106,334
|  align="right" |63%
|
|  |Dale M. Glading
|  align="right" |58,562
|  |35%
|
|  |Mark Heacock
|  |Green
|  align="right" |1,593
|  align="right" |<1%
|
|  |Margaret Chapman
|  |Time for Change
|  align="right" |1,257
|  align="right" |<1%
|
|  |Nicky I. Petrutz
|  |Defend American Constitution
|  align="right" |521
|  align="right" |<1%
|
|-
|2012
|
|  |Rob Andrews
|  align="right" |210,470
|  align="right" |68%
|
|  |Gregory W. Horton
|  align="right" |92,459
|  align="right" |30%
|
|  |John William Reitter
|  |Green
|  align="right" |4,413
|  align="right" |1%
|
|  |Margaret Chapman
|  |Reform Party
|  align="right" |1,177
|  align="right" |<1%

References

External links 

Office of former Congressman, constituent services

 
 

|-

|-

1957 births
21st-century American politicians
American Episcopalians
American people of Scotch-Irish descent
American people of Scottish descent
Bucknell University alumni
Cornell Law School alumni
Democratic Party members of the United States House of Representatives from New Jersey
County commissioners in New Jersey
Living people
People from Bellmawr, New Jersey
People from Haddon Heights, New Jersey
Politicians from Camden, New Jersey
Members of Congress who became lobbyists